Arbacia is a genus of sea urchins, widespread in the Atlantic and eastern Pacific oceans.

Species
According to the World Register of Marine Species : 
 Arbacia crenulata Kier, 1963 † (Miocene, east coast of USA)
 Arbacia dufresnii (Blainville, 1825) (Patagonia and Antarctica)
 Arbacia lixula (Linnaeus, 1758) (Mediterranean)
 Arbacia punctulata (Lamarck, 1816) (Caribbean)
 Arbacia rivuli Cooke, 1941a † (Pliocene, east coast of USA)
 Arbacia spatuligera (Valenciennes, 1846) (Peru and Chile)
 Arbacia stellata (Blainville, 1825; ?Gmelin, 1788) (East Pacific)
 Arbacia waccamaw Cooke, 1941a † (Pliocene, east coast of USA)

References 

Arbacioida